The Bezirksliga Oberbayern-Süd is currently the seventh tier of the German football league system in the southern part of the Bavarian Regierungsbezirk of Upper Bavaria. Until the disbanding of the Bezirksoberliga Oberbayern in 2012 it was the eighth tier. From 2008, when the 3. Liga was introduced, was the seventh tier of the league system, until the introduction of the Regionalligas in 1994 the sixth tier. From the league's inception in 1963 to the introduction of the Bezirksoberliga in 1988 it was the fifth tier.

Overview

History
Before the Bezirksoberligas in Bavaria were introduced in 1988 the Bezirksligas were the leagues set right below the Landesligas Bayern in the football pyramid from 1963 onwards, when the Landesligas were established. Until the establishment of the Bezirksoberliga, the league champions were not automatically promoted but instead had to play-off for promotion as there was five Bezirksligas feeding the Landesliga but initially only three, later four promotion spots.

In 1988, when the Bezirksoberligas were introduced, the league lost some of its status as it was relegated one tier. On a positive note, the league champions were now always promoted and the league runners-up had the opportunity to play-off for promotion as well.

With the league reform at the end of the 2011–12 season, which included an expansion of the number of Landesligas from three to five, the Bezirksoberligas were disbanded. Instead, the Bezirksligas took the place of the Bezirksoberligas once more below the Landesligas.

The following qualifying modus applied at the end of the 2011–12 season:
 Champions: Promotion round to the Landesliga, winners to the Landesliga, losers to the Bezirksliga.
 Teams placed 2nd to 12th: Remain in the Bezirksliga.
 Teams placed 13th to 16th: Directly relegated to Kreisliga.

Format
The winner of the Bezirksliga Oberbayern-Süd, like the winner of the Bezirksliga Oberbayern-Nord and Bezirksliga Oberbayern-Ost was, until 2011, directly promoted to the Bezirksoberliga Oberbayern. The runners-up of the Bezirksligas in Upper Bavaria would take part in a promotion round with the best-placed Bezirksoberliga team which did finish on a relegation rank to determine one or more additional promotion spots, depending on availability. From the 2012–13 season onwards, the league champion will be promoted to one of the five Landesligas. Given that the new Landesligas, unlike the old ones, are not geographically fixed the champion could end up in either the Landesliga Bayern-Südwest or the Landesliga Bayern-Südost.

The bottom three teams of each group were relegated to one of the Kreisligas.
At the same time the Kreisliga champions were promoted to the Bezirksliga. The runners-up of the Kreisligas faced a play-off with each other and the 12th placed teams in the Bezirksliga.

The Bezirksliga Oberbayern-Süd is fed by the following Kreisligas:
 Kreisliga Zugspitze 1
 Kreisliga Zugspitze 2
 Kreisliga München 2

Since 1995, the league has generally operated with a strength of 16 clubs and rarely deviated from this.

League timeline
The league went through the following timeline of positions in the league system:

League champions
The winners and runners–up of the league:

1963–88
The league champions and runners–up while being a feeder league to the Landesliga:

1988–2012
The league champions and runners–up while being a feeder league to the Bezirksoberliga:

2012–present
The league champions and runners–up while being a feeder league to the Landesliga once more:

 Promoted teams in bold.
 + Teams finished on equal points, decider needed to determine final position.
 Season was suspended in 2020 and then extended to 2021, when it was curtailed. Champion and runner-up were ranked on a points per game basis.

Current clubs
The clubs in the league in the 2021–22 season and their 2019–21 final placings:

References

Sources
 50 Jahre Bayerischer Fußball-Verband  50-year-anniversary book of the Bavarian FA. Vindelica Verlag. 1996

External links 
 Bayerischer Fußball-Verband (Bavarian FA)  
 Bavarian League tables and results  
 Website with tables and results from the Bavarian Oberliga to Bezirksliga  

4
Football in Upper Bavaria
1963 establishments in West Germany
Bezirksliga
Sports leagues established in 1963